Shaitan is a monotypic genus of ground spiders containing the single species, Shaitan elchini. It was first described by M. M. Kovblyuk, Z. A. Kastrygina & Yuri M. Marusik in 2013, and has only been found in Russia, Azerbaijan, and Kazakhstan.

References

Gnaphosidae
Spiders described in 2013
Spiders of Asia
Spiders of Russia